This article details the Wrestling at the 2000 Summer Olympics qualifying phase.

The 1999 World Championships was the first stage of a three-phase qualification system for wrestling at the 2000 Olympics.

For the first time FILA introduced a new qualification system. Five qualification tournaments were held in each style. Three of the five events counted towards each nation's total at each weight class. Athletes scored points for their nation at each event, based upon their placing at the weight class.

Timeline

Qualification summary

Men's freestyle events

54 kg

58 kg

63 kg

69 kg

76 kg

85 kg

97 kg

130 kg

Men's Greco-Roman events

54 kg

58 kg

63 kg

69 kg

76 kg

85 kg

97 kg

130 kg

Notes

References

Qualification
Qualification for the 2000 Summer Olympics
2000